This Is The Moody Blues is a two LP (later two CDs) compilation album by the Moody Blues, released in late 1974 while the band was on a self-imposed sabbatical. Though all of the songs were previously released on albums (with the exception of "A Simple Game" which was a 1968 B-side), several of them are heard here in distinctly different mixes. Like the Moody Blues albums of the time – but unlike most compilation albums, including later Moody Blues compilations – the songs on this album segue seamlessly, without silence between tracks.  On the original LP, this was true of the songs on each side; when the album was remastered for CD, each disc was also blended, so that "Legend of a Mind" segues into "In the Beginning", and "Watching and Waiting" segues into "I'm Just a Singer (In a Rock and Roll Band)".

The album was the first release to provide a separate name for "Late Lament", the symphonic coda and spoken poem that closes "Nights in White Satin".

This Is the Moody Blues was a commercial and critical success, reaching #14 in the United Kingdom and #11 in the United States.

Original track listing

Side One
 "Question" (Justin Hayward) (from A Question of Balance, 1970)  – 5:39
 "The Actor" (Hayward) (from In Search of the Lost Chord, 1968) – 4:11
 "The Word" (Graeme Edge) (spoken poem from In Search of the Lost Chord, remixed over instrumental "Beyond" from To Our Children's Children's Children, 1969) – 0:51
 "Eyes of a Child" (John Lodge) (from To Our Children's Children's Children) – 2:34
 "Dear Diary" (Ray Thomas) (from On the Threshold of a Dream, 1969) – 3:56
 "Legend of a Mind" (Thomas) (from In Search of the Lost Chord) – 6:37

Side Two
 "In the Beginning" (Edge) (from On the Threshold of a Dream) – 2:06
 "Lovely to See You" (Hayward) (from On the Threshold of a Dream) – 2:35
 "Never Comes the Day" (Hayward) (from On the Threshold of a Dream) – 4:39
 "Isn't Life Strange" (Edited version) (Lodge) (from Seventh Sojourn, 1972) – 5:32
 "The Dream" (Edge) (from On the Threshold of a Dream) – 0:52
 "Have You Heard? (Part 1)" (Mike Pinder) (from On the Threshold of a Dream) – 1:23
 "The Voyage" (Pinder) (from On the Threshold of a Dream) – 4:08
 "Have You Heard? (Part 2)" (Pinder) (from On the Threshold of a Dream) – 2:08

Side Three
 "Ride My See-Saw" (Lodge) (from In Search of the Lost Chord) – 3:32
 "Tuesday Afternoon" (Hayward) (from Days of Future Passed, 1967) – 4:04
 "And the Tide Rushes In" (Thomas) (from A Question of Balance) – 2:54
 "New Horizons" (Hayward) (from Seventh Sojourn) – 5:06
 "A Simple Game" (Pinder) (B-side to UK "Ride My See-Saw" single, 1968) – 3:18
 "Watching and Waiting" (Hayward, Thomas) (from To Our Children's Children's Children) – 4:21

Side Four
 "I'm Just a Singer (In a Rock and Roll Band)" (Lodge) (from Seventh Sojourn) – 4:11
 "For My Lady" (Thomas) (from Seventh Sojourn)  – 3:54
 "The Story in Your Eyes" (Hayward) (from Every Good Boy Deserves Favour, 1971) – 2:45
 "Melancholy Man" (Pinder) (from A Question of Balance) – 5:05
 "Nights in White Satin" (Hayward) (from Days of Future Passed) – 4:33
 "Late Lament" (Edge, Peter Knight) (from Days of Future Passed) – 2:33

Charts

Certifications

References

External links
Official Moody Blues Fanpage
Official Moody Blues Fan Community

Discography

The Moody Blues compilation albums
1974 compilation albums
Threshold Records albums
Albums produced by Tony Clarke (record producer)